Hello, Fraulein! is a 1949 German musical film directed by Rudolf Jugert and starring Margot Hielscher, Hans Söhnker and Peter van Eyck. It was made by the Munich-based company Bavaria Film in what would shortly become West Germany. It marked the German debut of van Eyck who had actually been born in Pomerania but had spent many years in the United States, leading him to be promoted in the film's publicity as an American actor.

The film's sets were designed by the art director Max Mellin. It was shot at the Bavaria Studios in Munich. The film's music combines elements of American big band jazz and German folk music.

Synopsis
In Southern Germany in the months after the end of the Second World War, the commander of American forces occupying a German town tries to promote friendship with the locals by organising a musical show with the assistance of a female music student who has recently returned from entertaining German soldiers on the Eastern Front. By inviting a multi-national orchestra to perform, the two achieve greater international harmony although the student ultimately decides to marry a local architect rather than the American soldier.

Cast
 Margot Hielscher as Maria Neubauer
 Hans Söhnker as Walter Reinhardt
 Peter van Eyck as Tom Keller
 Bobby Todd as Cesare
 Heidi Scharf as Renate
 Iska Geri as Grit
 Hannelore Bollmann as Herta
 Madelon Truß as Berta
 Werner Scharfenberger as Teddy
 Richard Bendig as Seppl
 Oliver Hassencamp as René
 Johannes Buzalski as Gabor
 Toni Thormal as Jan
 Jürgen Wulf as Hans
 Peter Fiedler as Fritz
 Panos Papadopulos as Musiker
 Freddie Brocksieper as Musiker
 Helmut Zacharias as Musiker
 Eberhard Keim as Musiker
 Cläre Ruegg as Frau Neuhaus
 Bob Norwood as Sergeant
 Franklie Clay as Sam
 Ingeborg Morawski as Frl. Senkpiel
 Petra Unkel as Roswitha
 Karl Schopp as Alois
 Thomas Quigley
 Bill Nuzun
 Gertrud Braun

References

Bibliography 
 Davidson, John & Hake, Sabine. Framing the Fifties: Cinema in a Divided Germany. Berghahn Books, 2007.
 Lutz Peter Koepnick. The Cosmopolitan Screen: German Cinema and the Global Imaginary, 1945 to the Present. University of Michigan Press, 2007.

External links 
 

1949 films
West German films
German musical films
1949 musical films
1940s German-language films
Films directed by Rudolf Jugert
Films about music and musicians
German black-and-white films
Bavaria Film films
Films shot at Bavaria Studios
1940s German films